Sandy Hook is a census-designated place in the town of Jamestown, Grant County, Wisconsin, United States. Its population was 185 as of the 2010 census.

References

Census-designated places in Grant County, Wisconsin
Census-designated places in Wisconsin